Rene Denfeld is an American author.

Her first novel, The Enchanted (Harper 2014), was awarded the French Prix du Premier Roman Etranger award, an ALA Medal for Excellence in Fiction, and a Carnegie Listing. The book was a finalist for the Center for Fiction First Novel Prize, The Oregonians Best Book of the Year, and listed for the Dublin International fiction prize. Her second novel, The Child Finder (Harper 2017), is a literary thriller examining the role of a young woman in finding a missing child.

Denfeld has written for The New York Times Magazine, The Oregonian and the Philadelphia Inquirer.

Novels 
 2014 - The Enchanted: A Novel (HarperCollins)
 2017 - The Child Finder (HarperCollins)
2019 - The Butterfly Girl (HarperCollins)

References

External links 
 

21st-century American writers
Living people
Writers from Portland, Oregon
Year of birth missing (living people)
21st-century American women writers